Suraj is a 1966 Hindi-language swashbuckler Ruritanian romance film produced by S. Krishnamurthy and T. Govindarajan and directed by T. Prakash Rao with Raj Baldev Raj as the Assistant Director.

The film stars Rajendra Kumar and Vyjayanthimala, with Ajit, Mumtaz, Johnny Walker,  Lalita Pawar, Neetu Singh, Gajanan Jagirdar, David Abraham Cheulkar, Agha, Mukri, Mallika and Niranjan Sharma in the supporting roles. The film's music was composed by Shankar Jaikishan, with the lyrics penned by Shailendra and Hasrat Jaipuri.

Plot
Vikram Singh is the Maharaja of Pratap Nagar and is very impressed with his Senapati Sangram Singh for years of loyal service. He decides to make him a Maharaja and agrees to marry his daughter, Anuradha, to his son, Pratap. Sometime later Sangram Singh's necklace given by Vikram Singh was stolen. He accused his servant, Ram Singh. He abducts Sangram Singh's son and exchanges him with his own son. Years later, Vikram sends his now grown-up Anuradha to visit the coronation of Rajkumar Pratap Singh and approve of him as her husband, and she sets off without any escort with just her maid-servant, Kalavati, for company. Shortly thereafter, Vikram is informed that Kalavati has been abducted by a bandit named Suraj Singh, he accordingly rushes over to Sangram's and this is where he discovers to his shock that Kalavati is posing as Anuradha, and it is his daughter that has been abducted by Suraj. When Suraj is arrested and lodged in a dungeon, preparations are set forth for the coronation of Pratap and his subsequently marriage with Anuradha.

Cast
 Rajendra Kumar as Suraj Singh
 Vyjayanthimala as   The Princess Anuradha
 Ajit as Prince Pratap Singh
 Mumtaz as Kalavati
 Johnny Walker as Bhola
 Bharathi as Geeta
 Lalita Pawar as the Maharani
 Neetu Singh as Young Geeta
 Gajanan Jagirdar as Ram Singh
 David as Maharaja Vikram Singh
 Agha as Kotwal Bhakti Charan / Bhagat Ram
 Mukri as Anokhe
 Mallika as Madhuri
 Niranjan Sharma as Maharaja Sangram Singh
 Moolchand as the chief of the Musicians
 Keshavlal as Pratap Singh's Man

Soundtrack

The film's music was composed by Shankar Jaikishan in one of their last successful albums. The lyrics were penned by Shailendra and Hasrat Jaipuri. The album also featured the singer Sharda with the chartbuster song "Titli Udi Ud Jo Chali", which became the song that she was most remembered for.

The soundtrack was listed by Planet Bollywood as number 86 on their list of 100 Greatest Bollywood Soundtracks. The song "Baharon Phool Barsao" topped the Binaca Geetmala annual list of 1966 charts. Similarly, the song "Titli Udi Ud Jo Chali" was listed at No. 21.

Box office
At the end of its theatrical run, the film grossed around 50,000,000 with a net of 25,000,000, thus becoming the second highest grossing film of 1966 with a verdict of super-hit at Box Office India. According to IBOS.com, the film had grossed at about 40.0 million and, adjusted to inflation, the gross is  5042.9 million. The film was also one of the last box office hits of Rajendra Kumar, who was regarded as Bollywood's silver jubilee actor. Vyjayanthimala and Rajendra Kumar had previously worked in many successful films such as Aas Ka Panchhi (1961), Sangam (1964) and Zindagi (1964).

Awards

References

External links
 

1966 films
1960s Hindi-language films
1960s Urdu-language films
Urdu-language Indian films
Films set in the 18th century
Films about revolutions
Films set in India
Films scored by Shankar–Jaikishan
Films directed by T. Prakash Rao
Hindi films remade in other languages
Indian swashbuckler films